Thomas Edwards-Freeman  (c. 1726–1808) was a British politician who sat in the House of Commons from 1768 to 1780  .

Early life
Edwards Freeman was the eldest son of Walter Edwards of St. Dunstan’s, London, and his wife Mary Freeman, daughter  of Richard Freeman of Batsford, Gloucestershire. In March 1742, he succeeded his uncle Richard Freeman in the Batsford estates and assumed the additional name of Freeman. He matriculated at Queen's College, Oxford, on 3 February 1744, aged 17. He married Elizabeth Reveley, daughter of Henry Reveley of Newby Wisk, Yorkshire on 23 July 1753.

Political career
At the  1768 general election, Edwards Freeman was returned unopposed as Member of Parliament for Steyning on the interest of Sir John Honywood, 3rd Baronet to whom he was distantly related. He seems to have acted completely independently in Parliament. In 1769 he became Director of the South Sea Company. He was reelected MP for Lewes unopposed  in 1774  but did not stand again in 1780 .

Later life
Edwards Freeman died on 15 February 1808, aged 81. His son Thomas was also MP for Steyning.,.

References

1720s births
1808 deaths
Alumni of The Queen's College, Oxford
British MPs 1768–1774
British MPs 1774–1780
Members of the Parliament of Great Britain for English constituencies